The Oscar Chinn Case (Britain v. Belgium). [1934], P.C.I.J. (Ser. A/B) No. 63
was a case of the Permanent Court of International Justice.

The Belgian government granted significant subsidies to a Belgian company, UNATRA, that offered transportation services in the Belgian Congo. Mr. Chinn, a British subject who operated a fluvial transport company on the Congo River could not compete (during the Great Depression) with the subsidised UNATRA's nominal prices and Britain brought a claim against the Belgian government as a matter of diplomatic protection.

The Court decided, based on the Convention of Saint-Germain 1919 and general principles of international law, that the Belgian Government did not violate any international legal obligations to the United Kingdom.

References
 

1937 in case law
1937 in international relations
Belgium–United Kingdom relations
Oscar Chinn Case